American Collegiate Rowing Association (ACRA) is one of the governing bodies of college rowing in the United States, together with the National Collegiate Athletic Association (NCAA) and the Intercollegiate Rowing Association (IRA).

History 
Established in 2008 by Gregg Hartsuff under the General Not for Profit Association Act of 1986, the American Collegiate Rowing Association (ACRA) is made up of club-level collegiate rowing teams.

The ACRA National Championship Regatta is considered the National Championship for collegiate club programs and all programs outside the NCAA/IRA structure.

The regatta is split into six regions: the Mid-Atlantic region, the Great Lakes region, the Plains region, the Northeast region, the South region, and the West Coast region. The ACRA is a broadcast partner of The Rowers Consortium of Huntington Harbour, California, who has broadcast the regatta on The Rowing Channel since 2014.

Members

Champions

Varsity 8+
Men
{| class="wikitable" style="font-size:85%;"
|-! style="background-color: #87D3F8;"
|Year and Champion
|-
| 2008  Michigan 
|-
| 2009  Michigan 
|-
| 2010  Michigan
|-
| 2011  Virginia
|-
| 2012  Virginia
|-
| 2013  Michigan
|-
| 2014  Michigan
|-
| 2015  Michigan
|-
| 2016  Michigan
|-
| 2017  UC Santa Barbara
|-
| 2018  Michigan
|-
| 2019 Delaware
|-
| 2022 George Washington

References

External links
Official website

College rowing in the United States
College sports governing bodies in the United States
Rowing governing bodies